White Squadron or white squadron may be:

White Squadron (Royal Navy), a former unit of the Royal Navy, flying the White Ensign
White Squadron (US Navy), an alternative term for the "Squadron of Evolution", a transitional unit in the US Navy.
White Squadron (Romania), a former Medevac unit of Royal Romanian Air Force.
The English title for the film Lo squadrone bianco